Minami ku (南区) is the name of several wards located in various cities in Japan.  The name literally translated to Southern District, and hence it is a very common ward name.

 Sapporo: see Minami-ku, Sapporo
 Niigata: see Minami-ku, Niigata
 Saitama: see Minami-ku, Saitama
 Yokohama: see Minami-ku, Yokohama
 Sagamihara: see Minami-ku, Sagamihara
 Hamamatsu:see Minami-ku, Hamamatsu
 Nagoya: see Minami-ku, Nagoya
 Kyoto: see Minami-ku, Kyoto
 Sakai: see Minami-ku, Sakai
 Okayama:see Minami-ku, Okayama
 Hiroshima: see Minami-ku, Hiroshima
 Fukuoka: see Minami-ku, Fukuoka
 Kumamoto: see Minami-ku, Kumamoto
 Minami-ku of Osaka merged with Higashi ward and is now part of the ward Chūō-ku